This following is an episode list for the Czech crime drama television series Kriminálka Anděl, which premiered on TV Nova on 1 September 2008.

Season 1 (2008)

Season 2 (2010)

Season 3 (2011) 
Third season was shot since April 2010.

References 

Lists of Czech television series episodes